Paranthrene xanthosoma is a moth of the family Sesiidae. It is known, from Uganda and Zimbabwe.

References

Sesiidae
Lepidoptera of Uganda
Lepidoptera of Zimbabwe
Moths of Sub-Saharan Africa
Moths described in 1910